Naomi is an unincorporated community in Fulton and Henry counties, in the U.S. state of Ohio.

History
Early variant names were Freedom and Freedom Mills. A post office called Freedom Mills was in operation from 1866 until 1880. A post office called Naomi was established in 1897, and closed in 1918. The present name of Naomi honors the family member of an early settler.

References

Unincorporated communities in Fulton County, Ohio
Unincorporated communities in Henry County, Ohio
Unincorporated communities in Ohio